Father J.M. Villars (circa 1818 - March 5, 1868) was a Catholic Priest in Indiana.  He died in mysterious circumstances in 1868.  He has since become a folk saint.

Life
Villars was born in Chavanay, France in 1818. He was ordained as a priest in Dubuque, Iowa in 1848. From 1862-1863 he served as an assistant at St. John's in Indianapolis, then moved to Richmond, Indiana to lead St. Mary's church.  He also took over as a visiting priest for the church in Cambridge, Indiana when the missionary who founded it became unable to continue running it.

Death
On Friday, March 6, 1868, when Villars did not show up for mass an altar boy was sent to check on him and found him dead in his bedroom, with his suspenders looped around the bedpost and his neck.  The death was officially determined to be a suicide, but many suspected murder. He was buried in Holy Cross Cemetery on the south side of Indianapolis.

Folk saint
People began making pilgrimages to  Villars' grave in the early 1910s, inspired by a woman who dreamed she saw Villars "hanging by a rope the victim of murder." The woman visited Villars' grave and prayed for her son who miraculously recovered. In the 1930s there were many reports of miraculous intercession by Villars, including a woman whose home was saved from foreclosure. 

Although the local archdiocese has done nothing to encourage people, and claims that there is "nothing special about Villars" people continue to visit the grave, praying and leaving coins and notes with pleas for miracles.

References

1818 births 
1868 deaths
Burials at Holy Cross and Saint Joseph Cemetery
Folk saints